This is a list of the main career statistics of Australian former tennis player Ken Rosewall whose playing career ran from 1951 until 1980. He played as an amateur from 1951 until the end of 1956 when he joined Jack Kramer's professional circuit. As a professional he was banned from playing the Grand Slam tournaments as well as other tournaments organized by the national associations of the International Lawn Tennis Federation (ILTF). In 1968, with the advent of the Open Era, the distinction between amateurs and professionals disappeared and Rosewall was again able to compete in most Grand Slam events until the end of his career in 1978. During his career he won eight Grand Slam, 15 Pro Slam and three Davis Cup titles.

Major finals

Grand Slam finals

Singles: 16 finals (8 titles, 8 runner-ups)

Pro Slam finals

Singles * : 15 titles, 4 runner-ups

 * other events (important professional tournaments – 2 runners-up)

WCT year end championship

Singles: 2 titles

Performance timeline

Ken Rosewall joined professional tennis in 1957 and was unable to compete in 45 Grand Slam tournaments until the open era arrives in 1968. Summarizing Grand Slam and Pro Slam tournaments, Rosewall won 23 titles, he has a winning record of 242–46 which represents 84.02% spanning 28 years.

Singles titles per year

Career finals

Amateur era
Singles (1951–1956) : 26 titles

Professional era
Singles (1957–1968) : 64 titles

Notes:
 1 : 4-men tournaments
 2 : Players take turns challenging the winner of the last game. Rosewall was the one who won the most matches.
 3 : 1 listed by the ATP Website

Open era

Singles (1968–1977) : 43 titles (including 39 listed by the ATP Website)

Notes:
 1 : 4-men tournaments.
 2 : 39 listed by the ATP website

Professional tours
Singles (1957–1967) : 7 tours

Team events

Davis Cup 

Rosewall won 17 out of 19 Davis Cup singles matches and 2 out of 3 doubles. Rosewall was a member of the victorious Australian Davis Cup teams in 1953, 1955, 1956 and 1973, in all cases defeating USA in the final. He did not personally participate in the 1973 final.

Kramer Cup 
In this pro "Davis Cup-format" team event, held just 3 years (1961–1963) and opposing the subcontinents Australia, Europe, North America and South America, Rosewall won 9 out of 10 singles matches and 4 out of 5 doubles. Australia won all three editions.

Head to head 
Rosewall's win–loss record against top players is as follows.

Notes

Sources 
 Joe McCauley, The History of Professional Tennis, London 2001.
 Michel Sutter, Vainqueurs Winners 1946–2003, Paris 2003.
 Tony Trabert, Tennis de France.
 Robert Geist, Der Grösste Meister Die denkwürdige Karriere des australischen Tennisspielers Kenneth Robert Rosewall, Vienna 1999.
 Bud Collins, The Bud Collins History of Tennis, 2008.

External links
 
 
 
 

Rosewall, Ken

fr:Ken Rosewall